The Peterborough ditch murders were a series of murders which took place in Cambridgeshire, England, in March 2013. All three victims were male and died from stab wounds. Their bodies were discovered dumped in ditches outside Peterborough. In Hereford, two other men were stabbed, but survived. The perpetrator was Joanna Christine Dennehy, a Cambridgeshire woman, who was later sentenced to life imprisonment with a whole life order.

Victims
Kevin Lee was a property developer, landlord and lover of Dennehy. Lukasz Slaboszewski, a Polish national, met Dennehy through a shared interest in drink and drugs, and John Chapman was a housemate of Dennehy. Slaboszewski was killed at some point between 19 and 29 March 2013. Both Lee and Chapman were killed on 29 March.  Lee's body was found the next day near Newborough; Dennehy had dressed his body in a black sequined dress before dumping the corpse. The bodies of Slaboszewski and Chapman were found on 3 April near Thorney with stab wounds.

After the killings, Dennehy was driven by her friend Gary Stretch (formerly known as Gary Richards) to Hereford where she stabbed two men, chosen separately and at random, both of whom survived. Both men were dog walkers; she stole the second man's dog. Another man, travelling in the car unwillingly, was later cleared of criminal involvement in the attacks.

Victim selection and motives
Dennehy, born August 1982 in St Albans, Hertfordshire, grew up in nearby Harpenden, and was an absent mother of two young children at the time of the killings. She specifically targeted men during her killing spree, telling her acquaintance Lloyd that she did not wish to kill a woman and especially not a woman with children. Lloyd stated Dennehy had wanted to kill nine men in total, seeking to be like Bonnie and Clyde. Dennehy stabbed men for the purpose of "entertainment", telling Stretch, "I want my fun. I need you to get my fun." She later told a psychiatrist that she had found murder to be "moreish" and that after the first killing she "got a taste for it."

Court proceedings
In November 2013, Dennehy pleaded guilty to all three murders and two further attempted murders. Her sister Maria was unsurprised by the guilty plea and said, "I think she did that to control the situation. She likes people to know she's the boss." Dennehy was held on remand at HM Prison Bronzefield. Assessing psychiatrists later diagnosed Dennehy with psychopathic, anti-social and borderline personality disorders.

Two men, Richards, 47, and Leslie Layton, 36, stood trial charged with a range of crimes relating to assisting Dennehy. Both decided not to give evidence in their defence. The jury began deliberation on 4 February 2014. On 10 February, Richards was found guilty of attempted murder and Layton was found guilty of perverting the course of justice. On 12 February, Layton and Richards were convicted of all other charges.

On 28 February 2014, at the Old Bailey, Dennehy was sentenced to life imprisonment. The trial judge, Mr Justice Spencer, ordered that she should never be released due to the premeditation of each murder. Spencer said further that Dennehy was sadomasochistic, and lacked the normal range of human emotions. As of 2014, Dennehy has since become one of three women in the UK to be given a whole life tariff, after Myra Hindley and Rosemary West.

Richards was also sentenced at the Old Bailey alongside Dennehy to life imprisonment, with a recommended minimum term of 19 years. Layton was sentenced to a total of 14 years, and Robert Moore, 55, who admitted to assisting an offender, received a three-year prison sentence.

After the trial
After the trial it emerged that the Probation Service was supervising Dennehy at the time of the murders as she had been convicted of assault and owning a dangerous dog. It was later concluded that the staff dealing with her were inexperienced.

Escape plot
While Dennehy was on remand before the trial, prison staff found an escape plot in her diary. This involved killing or seriously injuring a prison officer, cutting off one of the officer’s fingers and using the amputated finger to fool the biometric system in the prison. Because of the plot, Dennehy was placed in solitary confinement from September 2013 (before the court proceedings) to September 2015 (after the proceedings). She claims isolation left her 'tearful and upset' and led to self harm.

The High Court rejected Dennehy's claim that her human rights had been violated. Government lawyers argued isolation was necessary due to the nature of Dennehy's offences and the risk she could pose to the public if she were to escape.  Mr Justice Singh found solitary confinement was "in accordance with law (...) at all material times it has been necessary and proportionate". At the time, Dennehy was incarcerated in HMP Bronzefield, Surrey.

Imprisonment 
In 2018 she requested permission to marry her cellmate Hayley Palmer and received a positive answer from prison authorities, to the dismay of Palmer's family, who feared Dennehy might endanger her. In 2018 both Dennehy and Palmer tried to kill themselves during a suicide pact. In June 2020 she was reported to be in a relationship with another prisoner, Emma Aitken, a 25-year-old serving a twelve-year sentence for her part in the murder of a man whose body was dumped outside a social club. In May 2021 it was again reported Dennehy and Palmer, since released from a sixteen-year robbery sentence, intended to marry.

In 2019 Dennehy was moved to Low Newton Prison in County Durham. Upon her arrival she threatened to kill Rosemary West, who had been moved to another prison.

In popular culture
Dennehy’s story was featured in The Murderer & Me: Joanna Dennehy, a documentary that aired on Sky Crime in the UK and Ireland on 21 February 2021.

See also
 List of serial killers in the United Kingdom
 Nicola Edgington, British woman who went on a killing spree in 2012

References

2013 in England
2013 murders in the United Kingdom
2010s in Cambridgeshire
2010s trials
British female serial killers
female serial killers
Deaths by stabbing in England
History of Herefordshire
History of Peterborough
Male murder victims
March 2013 crimes in Europe
March 2013 events in the United Kingdom
Murder in Cambridgeshire
Murder trials
Serial murders in the United Kingdom
Trials in England
Violence against men in the United Kingdom

ru:Деннехи, Джоанна